Suh Yun-bok (9 January 1923 – 27 June 2017) was a South Korean marathoner, who is best known as the winner of the 1947 Boston Marathon. 

He won the race with a world best time of 2:25:39 under the coach Sohn Kee-chung, the Korean winner of the marathon at the 1936 Berlin Olympics. His participation in the Boston Marathon was financed by donations from servicemen in the United States Forces Korea. His win was the first time a world best for the men's marathon was set at the Boston Marathon. The previous world best was set by his coach Sohn in Tokyo, Japan in 1935.

In 1948, one year after the Boston victory, Suh competed in the marathon at the 1948 Summer Olympics held in London. He retired in 1949.

Marathon career 
 May 1946: Champion at the 1st All-Korea Marathon (전조선 마라톤 선수권대회)
 September 1946: Champion at the 1st Korea National Track and Field Meet (전국육상선수권대회)
 October 1946: Champion at the Korean National Sports Festival (전국체육대회)
 April 1947: Set a world record of 2:25:39 at the 51st Boston Marathon
 June 1948: represented South Korea in the 1948 Summer Olympics in London

See also
List of winners of the Boston Marathon

References

1923 births
2017 deaths
South Korean male long-distance runners
Athletes (track and field) at the 1948 Summer Olympics
Olympic athletes of South Korea
World record setters in athletics (track and field)
Boston Marathon male winners
20th-century South Korean people